Constraint may refer to:
 Constraint (computer-aided design), a demarcation of geometrical characteristics between two or more entities or solid modeling bodies
 Constraint (mathematics), a condition of an optimization problem that the solution must satisfy
 Constraint (classical mechanics), a relation between coordinates and momenta
 Constraint (information theory), the degree of statistical dependence between or among variables
 Constraints (journal), a scientific journal
 Constraint (database), a concept in relational database

See also 
 Biological constraints, factors which make populations resistant to evolutionary change
 Carrier's constraint
 Constrained optimization, in finance, linear programming, economics and cost modeling
 Constrained writing, in literature
 Constraint algorithm, such as SHAKE, or LINCS
 Constraint satisfaction, in computer science
 Finite domain constraint
 First class constraint in Hamiltonian mechanics
 Integrity constraints
 Loading gauge, a constraint in engineering
 Optimality theory, in linguistics, a constraint-based theory which is primarily influential in phonology
 Primary constraint in Hamiltonian mechanics
 Restraint (disambiguation)
 Second class constraint in Hamiltonian mechanics
 Secondary constraint in Hamiltonian mechanics
 Structure gauge, a constraint in engineering
 Theory of constraints, in business management